Rupert Simonian (born 25 January 1991) is a British actor with Canada dual citizenship who is best known for his role in Not Going Out as Nicky. Simonian's career began at the age of 11 when he was spotted by a casting agent while attending the Harrodian School. He was subsequently cast in Peter Pan, directed by P. J. Hogan, and continued acting throughout childhood, branching out into television, theatre and radio in later years.

Theatre

TV

Film

Radio

References

1991 births
Living people
People educated at The Harrodian School
Male actors from London
English male radio actors
English male film actors
English male television actors
Canadian people of English descent
Canadian male radio actors
Canadian male film actors
Canadian male television actors